Creed: Original Motion Picture Soundtrack is a soundtrack album for the 2015 film Creed, which features music by various artists. The album was released on November 20, 2015, through Atlantic Records.

Overview
In March 2015, it was announced that composer Ludwig Göransson would score Creed, marking the second feature-length film collaboration between Göransson and director Ryan Coogler after Fruitvale Station (2013). Influenced by 1970s culture and the musical legacy of the Rocky film series, Coogler noted that "the music was a big focal point" for the film, stating, "'Eye of the Tiger', 'No Easy Way Out', all those songs were a massive hit. And we embraced that. We recorded original songs for the movie." Göransson brought in an array of artists to modernize the orchestral aspects of the soundtrack. "The first name that came to mind was obviously Meek Mill, because we needed a voice from Philly," said Göransson. "For me that was an obvious choice for the big training montage. It's all full orchestral, and it has some dark 808s under it. In the middle there are all these dirt bikes coming out, and there's a 45-second rap verse that Meek Mill is doing over that." Other musicians that recorded with Göransson specifically for the film include Donald Glover, Future, Vince Staples, and Jhené Aiko.

A music video for Mill's "Lord Knows" was created as a companion to the film. Released on November 20, 2015, the Spike Jordan-directed video features footage from the film edited together with footage of Mill and Tory Lanez performing the song. Both of Mill's respective tracks that appear on the film's soundtrack, the former, along with "Check", were originally listed on his sophomore album, Dreams Worth More Than Money, released earlier that year.

Actress Tessa Thompson, who portrays singer/songwriter Bianca in the film, was involved early with the film's preparation in order to write music for her character with Göransson. "We spent two weeks in Los Angeles in a studio basically writing from morning until night," said Thompson. "It was cool and also gave me insight on [Bianca's] musical abilities, which is something I dabbled in." Three tracks featuring Thompson are included in the film: "Grip", "Breathe", and "Shed You".

Track listing

Chart positions

Score album

Creed: Original Motion Picture Score is a soundtrack album for the 2015 film Creed, composed by Ludwig Göransson. It was released on November 20, 2015, through WaterTower Music. The score was recorded with a 100-piece orchestra and a 24-piece choir at Warner Bros. Studios.

† - Contains interpolations of "Going The Distance" and "Gonna Fly Now (Theme from Rocky)" from the original Rocky film.

Personnel

Production
Ludwig Göransson – composer, producer
Bill Conti – original material
Jasper Randall – choir conductor / choir contractor

Technical
Joe Shirley – technical score engineer
Ronald J. Webb – music editor
Chris Fogel – music scoring mixer
John W. Chapman – score mix assistant

Orchestration
Pete Anthony – conductor
Erik Arvinder – orchestrator
Jeff Atmajian – orchestrator
Luke Flynn – music preparation
Mark Graham – head of music preparation
Tom Hardisty – music scoring recordist
Gabe Hilfer – music supervisor
Riley Hughes – music preparation
Jacob Nathan – music coordinator
Victor Pesavento – music preparation
Peter Rotter – orchestra contractor
Henri Wilkinson – orchestrator
Joe Zimmerman – music preparation

Additional music
Additional music credited in Creed:

References

External links
Official soundtrack album entry at Atlantic Records
Official score album entry at WaterTower Music

Rocky (film series) soundtracks
2015 soundtrack albums
2010s film soundtrack albums
Atlantic Records soundtracks
WaterTower Music soundtracks
Drama film soundtracks
Ludwig Göransson soundtracks